Bull Pass is a low pass through the Olympus Range, between Mount Jason and Mount Orestes, joining McKelvey Valley and Wright Valley in the McMurdo Dry Valleys of Victoria Land, Antarctica. It was named by the Victoria University of Wellington Antarctic Expedition (1958–59) for Colin Bull, who led this expedition. Prospect Mesa is located just below the pass.

References
 

Mountain passes of Victoria Land
McMurdo Dry Valleys